William Newman Ramsey (27 September 1943 – 7 July 2020) was an English professional rugby league footballer who played as a  or  in the 1960s and 1970s, and coached in the 1970s. He played at representative level for Great Britain, Yorkshire, and Commonwealth XIII, and at club level for Hunslet, Leeds, Bradford Northern, Hull FC and Widnes during the era of contested scrums, and coached at club level for Hunslet. During his Leeds career Ramsey appeared in 17 major Finals, including five at Wembley Stadium, London, scored a rare drop goal in the 1969 Championship Final, toured twice in 1966 and 1974, and won seven winners medals with Leeds.

Background
Ramsey's was born in Leeds.

Playing career

Hunslet
Ramsey played left- in Hunslet's 16–20 defeat by Wigan in the 1965 Challenge Cup Final at Wembley Stadium, London, on Saturday 8 May 1965, in front of a crowd of 89,016. Ramsey represented Commonwealth XIII in 1965 against New Zealand at Crystal Palace National Recreation Centre, London on Wednesday 18 August 1965, Ramsey won caps for Great Britain while at Hunslet in 1965 against New Zealand (2 matches), in 1966 against France, Australia (2 matches), and New Zealand (2 matches),

Ramsey played left- in Hunslet's 8–17 defeat by Bradford Northern in the 1965 Yorkshire Cup Final Headingley, Leeds on Saturday 16 October 1965.

Leeds
Ramsey was transferred from Hunslet to Leeds in 1967 for £10,000, he made his début, and scored a try for Leeds against Keighley on Friday 8 December 1967.

International honours
Bill Ramsey won caps for Great Britain while at Leeds in 1974 against New Zealand.

Championship final appearances
Bill Ramsey played, and scored a drop goal in Leeds' 16–14 victory over Castleford in the Championship Final during the 1968–69 season at Odsal Stadium, Bradford on Saturday 24 May 1969.
During Bill Ramsey's time at Leeds there was a 9–5 victory over St. Helens in the Championship Final during the 1971–72 season.

County League appearances
Bill Ramsey played in Leeds' victories in the Yorkshire League during the 1967–68 season, 1968–69 season and 1969–70 season.

Challenge Cup Final appearances
Bill Ramsey played left- in Leeds' 11–10 victory over Wakefield Trinity in the 1968 Challenge Cup Finale (the "Watersplash" final) at Wembley Stadium] on Saturday 11 May 1968, played   in the 7–24 defeat by Leigh in the 1971 Challenge Cup at Wembley Stadium on Saturday 15 May 1971, in front of a crowd of 85,514, and played right- in the 13–16 defeat by St. Helens in the 1972 Challenge Cup Final at Wembley on Saturday 13 May 1972, in front of a crowd of 89,495.

County Cup Final appearances
Bill Ramsey played left- (replaced by interchange/substitute Merv Hicks) in Leeds' 22–11 victory over Castleford in the 1968 Yorkshire Cup Final at Belle Vue, Wakefield on Saturday 19 October 1968, played left- and scored a try in the 23–7 victory over Featherstone Rovers in the 1970 Yorkshire Cup Final at Odsal Stadium, Bradford on Saturday 21 November 1970, played right- in the 36–9 victory over Dewsbury in the 1972 Yorkshire Cup Final at Odsal on Saturday 7 October 1972, and was an interchange/substitute in the 7–2 victory over Wakefield Trinity in the 1973 Yorkshire Cup Final at Headingley on Saturday 20 October 1973.

BBC2 Floodlit Trophy Final appearances
Bill Ramsey played right- in Leeds' 9–5 victory over St. Helens in the 1970 BBC2 Floodlit Trophy Final at Headingley on Tuesday 15 December 1970.

Bradford Northern
Ramsey signed for Bradford Northern on 27 January 1974, he stayed at the club until 8 September that year.

Hull
Ramsey spent the 1975–76 Northern Rugby Football League season with Hull F.C.

Players No.6 Trophy Final appearances
Ramsey played left- in Hull's 13–19 defeat by Widnes in the 1975–76 Player's No.6 Trophy Final at Headingley on Saturday 24 January 1976.

Widnes
Ramsey played left- in Widnes' 13–16 defeat by Leeds in the 1977 Challenge Cup Final at Wembley on Saturday 7 May 1977.

County Cup Final appearances
Ramsey played left- in Widnes' 16–11 victory over Workington Town in the 1976 Lancashire Cup Final at Central Park, Wigan on Saturday 30 October 1976.

Players No.6 Trophy Final appearances
Ramsey played left- in Widnes' 4–9 defeat by Warrington in the 1977–78 Player's No.6 Trophy Final at Knowsley Road, St. Helens on Saturday 28 January 1978.

Coaching career
After retiring from playing Ramsey returned to Hunslet as coach in 1978 and coached the team to promotion to the First Division in 1979.

Personal life
Ramsey married Marlene Chilton and they had two sons.

References

External links
(archived by web.archive.org) On This Day – 8 December
Statistics at rugby.widnes.tv
Rugby Cup Final 1968

1943 births
2020 deaths
Bradford Bulls players
English rugby league coaches
English rugby league players
Great Britain national rugby league team players
Hull F.C. players
Hunslet F.C. (1883) players
Hunslet R.L.F.C. coaches
Leeds Rhinos players
Rugby league locks
Rugby league players from Leeds
Rugby league props
Rugby league second-rows
Widnes Vikings players
Yorkshire rugby league team players